The 2014 British Supersport season was the 27th British Supersport Championship season.

Race calendar and results
The 2014 MCE Insurance British Superbike Championship calendar was announced on 10 October 2013 by MSVR.

Championship standings

References

External links
 The official website of the British Supersport Championship

British
Supersport
British Supersport Championship